The Federal Correctional Complex, Lompoc (FCC Lompoc) is a United States federal prison complex for male inmates in California. It is run by the Federal Bureau of Prisons, a division of the United States Department of Justice, and consists of two facilities:

 Federal Correctional Institution, Lompoc (FCI Lompoc): a low-security facility.
 United States Penitentiary, Lompoc (USP Lompoc): a medium-security facility with an adjacent satellite prison camp for minimum-security inmates.

See also
List of U.S. federal prisons
Federal Bureau of Prisons
Incarceration in the United States

References

Buildings and structures in Santa Barbara County, California
Lompoc
Lompoc